Mónica Carrió Esteban (born 28 March 1977 in Alzira) is a former weightlifter, competing in the 75 kg category and representing Spain at international competitions.

She participated at the 2000 Summer Olympics in the 75 kg event. She competed at world championships, most recently at the 2001 World Weightlifting Championships.

Mónica is the sister of weightlifter Lorenzo Carrió, who competed at the 1996 Summer Olympics.

Major results

References

External links
 
 
 
 
 
 
 

1977 births
Living people
Spanish female weightlifters
Weightlifters at the 2000 Summer Olympics
Olympic weightlifters of Spain
People from Alzira, Valencia
Sportspeople from the Province of Valencia
Mediterranean Games silver medalists for Spain
Mediterranean Games medalists in weightlifting
Competitors at the 2001 Mediterranean Games
21st-century Spanish women